Marie Heim-Vögtlin (7 October 1845 in Bözen – 7 November 1916 in Zürich) was the first female Swiss physician, a writer and a co-founder of the first Swiss gynaecological hospital.

Education 
Born as the daughter of the pastor of Bözen, Marie Vögtlin benefited from a private education in the Romandie and in Zürich. In 1867, her fiancé, a student of medicine, broke off the engagement. He married Nadezhda Suslova, Europe's first female physician, instead. In response and with the reluctant support of her father, Vögtlin applied for admission herself to the study of medicine at the University of Zürich, which had been the first medical faculty in Europe to admit women. This caused a national scandal, as previously only a few "impudent" foreign women such as Suslova had been matriculated there.

At the university, Vögtlin and her few fellow women students benefited from particular support by the faculty, even as many conservatives decried the medical education of women as shameful and as a waste of time. After Vögtlin passed the examinations with honours, she studied gynaecology in Leipzig and worked in a Dresden maternity ward. On 11 July 1874 she attained her doctorate in Zürich with a dissertation on the topic of the state of the female genitalia in labour. It required the intervention of her father for her to obtain an official permission to practice medicine in Zürich.

Professional and family life 
Although her practice had few clients at first, Vögtlin soon acquired a reputation as a capable and well-liked physician, and was particularly noted for her generosity towards poor women.

In 1875, she married the noted geologist Albert Heim after he had given his permission (as required by law at that time) for her to continue working after marriage. The couple had two children, Arnold and Helene, and also cared for a foster child. In 1916, Marie Heim-Vögtlin died of a lung disease.

Social activism
Marie Heim-Vögtlin was a co-founder of the Schweizerische Pflegerinnenschule mit Spital, Switzerland's first gynaecological hospital, which also featured a maternity ward and nurses' school. After the school opened in 1901, she served as its bursar. She was an active participant in the women's suffrage and temperance movements and published several works, mostly popular writings for women and children.

Honours
The Swiss National Science Foundation (SNSF) has named a women's scholarship in Marie Heim-Vögtlin's honour. In 1995, a lane near the Zürich women's hospital was named after her. In 2010 Marie Heim-Vögtlin's work was honoured by the Gesellschaft zu Fraumünster. In 2016, the hundredth anniversary of her death is commemorated with a Swiss Post stamp.

References

Footnotes

External links 

 
 Marie Heim-Vögtlin Programme

1845 births
1916 deaths
People from Brugg District
Swiss Calvinist and Reformed Christians
Swiss gynaecologists
Swiss women physicians
Swiss writers in German
20th-century Swiss physicians
19th-century Swiss physicians
20th-century women scientists
19th-century women scientists
University of Zurich alumni
20th-century women physicians
19th-century women physicians